José Manuel Cruzalta Cruz (born 8 April 1978 in Tenancingo, State of México), is a retired Mexican football defender.

Club career
He made his debut with Toluca on 14 February 2001 in a 3–1 loss against Tecos UAG.

Cruzalta also split time with Toluca's farm team, Atlético Mexiquense, where he served as the team's captain.

Honours
 Toluca
Primera División de México (4): Apertura 2002, Apertura 2005, Apertura 2008, Bicentenario 2010

External links

1978 births
Living people
Footballers from the State of Mexico
Association football defenders
Deportivo Toluca F.C. players
Atlético Morelia players
Atlético Mexiquense footballers
Lobos BUAP footballers
Liga MX players
Mexican footballers